Wigsthorpe is a hamlet in the east of the English county of Northamptonshire, south of the town of Oundle and the village of Barnwell.

It is in North Northamptonshire and is part of the civil parish of Thorpe Achurch.

References

External links

Hamlets in Northamptonshire
North Northamptonshire